Zatorze-Kolonia  is a settlement in the administrative district of Gmina Biała Piska, within Pisz County, Warmian-Masurian Voivodeship, in northern Poland.

References

Zatorze-Kolonia